All Killer No Filler is the debut studio album by Canadian rock band Sum 41, released on May 8, 2001. It was certified platinum in the United States, Canada, and in the UK.

Despite mixed reviews, the album was a commercial success, peaking at No. 13 on the Billboard 200. The single, "Fat Lip" peaked at No. 1 on the Billboard Alternative Airplay.

Composition, music, and influences
The album's style has been described as pop punk and skate punk. NOFX's album Punk in Drublic was a considerable influence on the album. Sum 41's vocalist Deryck Whibley cites Rancid, Elvis Costello, the Beatles, and Pennywise as influences on All Killer No Filler. The band has mentioned Green Day as their main influence for the album. "I was about 14 when Dookie came out," Whibley says. "I remember seeing the video for 'Basket Case' for the first time... It had so much energy and it was so different. I'd never seen anything like it before. From then I was an instant fan."

Absolutepunk described the album as "the album that your parents don't want you to discover at age 11 when you're just starting to think that school is bullshit and the only thing that really matters is that ridiculously cute girl who honestly treats you like shit", as well as adding "The lyrics are broad enough that everyone can relate to them, but specific enough that each song makes you think of a certain person or situation in your life. The perfect balance".

Steve Jocz wrote "Pain for Pleasure" in 10 minutes while he was on the toilet.  The song, sung by Jocz, is an homage to the style of Iron Maiden.  During performances, the band takes on costumes and persona in that style.

Release
On March 8, 2001, All Killer No Filler was announced for release in two months' time. All Killer No Filler, which was Sum 41's first full-length album, was released on May 8, 2001. In August, the band performed at Edgefest II in Canada. In October, the band embarked on a headlining US tour, with support from Unwritten Law and Gob. Alongside the tour, the band performed on Saturday Night Live. In April 2002, the band went on a tour of the east coast US and Canada territories, with support from H2O, and Autopilot Off. Following this, the band toured the US and Canada with Goldfinger. On April 6, 2011, a special edition of the album was released to celebrate the 10th anniversary of All Killer No Filler, exclusive to Japan.

From the initial success of the album, Deryck Whibley stated that it led him to "immediate embarrassment" stating that "I've always felt it wasn't that great, if I'm being honest," and "I never quite understood - to a point where it's almost like, when people tell me it means a lot to them or it was a really good album compared to other records, I always think they're lying."

Reception and commercial performance

Despite initially receiving mixed reviews in 2001, the album has received retrospective acclaim in more recent years. AllMusic said "It would be a mistake to view Sum 41 as just another second-rate band cashing in on the early-'00s punk-pop boom, even if it did recruit Jerry Finn to produce All Killer No Filler." Top40.com ranked the album as the 9th greatest pop punk album of all time. The album was included in Rock Sounds 101 Modern Classics list at number 46. The album was included at number 11 on Rock Sounds "The 51 Most Essential Pop Punk Albums of All Time" list. BuzzFeed included the album at number 4 on their "36 Pop Punk Albums You Need To Hear Before You F——ing Die" list.

The album was very successful; it was certified platinum by the Recording Industry Association of America in August 2001 and in 2002, it was reported that the album sold at least 1,690,000 copies in the United States. "Fat Lip" was the most successful song on All Killer No Filler, going to number 66 on the Billboard Hot 100 on September 8, 2001 and number 1 on the Alternative Songs chart on August 18, 2001. "In Too Deep" went to number 10 on the Alternative Songs chart on December 1, 2001. All Killer No Filler went to number 13 on the Billboard 200 on August 4, 2001, and was on the Billboard 200 for 49 weeks. During 2001, "Fat Lip" went to number 1 on MTV's Total Request Live many times. All Killer No Filler was among the top 30 best-selling albums of 2001 in Canada and the third-best selling album of the year in Canada by a Canadian artist.  Between 1996 and 2016, All Killer No Filler was among the top 20 best-selling albums by Canadian bands in Canada.

Track listing

The 7 Series: All Killer No Filler
Island Records released an EP to promote the All Killer No Filler album by releasing seven songs from the album.

"Nothing on My Back"
"Fat Lip"
"Rhythms
"Motivation"
"In Too Deep"
"Handle This"
"Pain for Pleasure"

Personnel

Sum 41
Deryck Whibley – lead vocals, rhythm guitar; drums on "Pain for Pleasure"
Dave Baksh – lead guitar, backing vocals; co-lead vocals on "Fat Lip"
Jason McCaslin – bass guitar, backing vocals
Steve Jocz – drums, percussion, backing vocals; co-lead vocals on "Fat Lip"; lead vocals on "Pain for Pleasure"

Additional musicians
 Greig Nori – backing vocals on "Motivation", "In Too Deep" and "Handle This", additional guitar on "Handle This" and "Pain for Pleasure"
 Kerry King – guitar solo on "It's What We're All About"
 Tommy Lee – drums on "It's What We're All About" (live)

Artwork
Chris Wahl – inner inlay photo
Jonathan Mannion – outer inlay & interior group photo design
Kim Kinakin – album design

Production
Jerry Finn – producer
Tom Lord-Alge – mixing
Joe McGrath – engineer
Sean O'Dwyer – engineer
Ari Martin, & Nettwerk Management – management
Brian Gardner – mastering
Gizelle Galang – business affairs
Rob Mitchell – A&R coordination
Robert Steveson & Lewis Largent – A&R
Joel Kazmi – assistant
Robert Read – assistant
Alan Sanderson – assistant
Katie Teasdale – assistant

Chart history

Weekly charts

Year-end charts

Certifications

Notes

References
Citations

Sources

External links

All Killer No Filler at YouTube (streamed copy where licensed)

2001 debut albums
Sum 41 albums
Aquarius Records (Canada) albums
Island Records albums
Albums produced by Jerry Finn
Albums recorded at Metalworks Studios